Silicon is a chemical element with the symbol Si and atomic number 14. It is a hard, brittle crystalline solid with a blue-grey metallic luster, and is a tetravalent metalloid and semiconductor. It is a member of group 14 in the periodic table: carbon is above it; and germanium, tin, lead, and flerovium are below it. It is relatively unreactive.

Because of its high chemical affinity for oxygen, it was not until 1823 that Jöns Jakob Berzelius was first able to prepare it and characterize it in pure form. Its oxides form a family of anions known as silicates. Its melting and boiling points of 1414 °C and 3265 °C, respectively, are the second highest among all the metalloids and nonmetals, being surpassed only by boron.

Silicon is the eighth most common element in the universe by mass, but very rarely occurs as the pure element in the Earth's crust. It is widely distributed in space in cosmic dusts, planetoids, and planets as various forms of silicon dioxide (silica) or silicates. More than 90% of the Earth's crust is composed of silicate minerals, making silicon the second most abundant element in the Earth's crust (about 28% by mass), after oxygen.

Most silicon is used commercially without being separated, often with very little processing of the natural minerals. Such use includes industrial construction with clays, silica sand, and stone. Silicates are used in Portland cement for mortar and stucco, and mixed with silica sand and gravel to make concrete for walkways, foundations, and roads. They are also used in whiteware ceramics such as porcelain, and in traditional silicate-based soda-lime glass and many other specialty glasses. Silicon compounds such as silicon carbide are used as abrasives and components of high-strength ceramics. Silicon is the basis of the widely used synthetic polymers called silicones.

The late 20th century to early 21st century has been described as the Silicon Age (also known as the Digital Age or Information Age) because of the large impact that elemental silicon has on the modern world economy. The small portion of very highly purified elemental silicon used in semiconductor electronics (<10%) is essential to the transistors and integrated circuit chips used in most modern technology such as smartphones and other computers. In 2019, 32.4% of the semiconductor market segment was for networks and communications devices, and the semiconductors industry is projected to reach $726.73 billion by 2027.

Silicon is an essential element in biology. Only traces are required by most animals, but some sea sponges and microorganisms, such as diatoms and radiolaria, secrete skeletal structures made of silica. Silica is deposited in many plant tissues.

History
Owing to the abundance of silicon in the Earth's crust, natural silicon-based materials have been used for thousands of years. Silicon rock crystals were familiar to various ancient civilizations, such as the predynastic Egyptians who used it for beads and small vases, as well as the ancient Chinese. Glass containing silica was manufactured by the Egyptians since at least 1500 BC, as well as by the ancient Phoenicians. Natural silicate compounds were also used in various types of mortar for construction of early human dwellings.

Discovery

In 1787, Antoine Lavoisier suspected that silica might be an oxide of a fundamental chemical element, but the chemical affinity of silicon for oxygen is high enough that he had no means to reduce the oxide and isolate the element. After an attempt to isolate silicon in 1808, Sir Humphry Davy proposed the name "silicium" for silicon, from the Latin silex, silicis for flint, and adding the "-ium" ending because he believed it to be a metal. Most other languages use transliterated forms of Davy's name, sometimes adapted to local phonology (e.g. German Silizium, Turkish silisyum, Catalan silici, Armenian Սիլիցիում or Silitzioum). A few others use instead a calque of the Latin root (e.g. Russian кремний, from кремень "flint"; Greek πυρίτιο from πυρ "fire"; Finnish pii from piikivi "flint", Czech křemík from křemen "quartz", "flint").

Gay-Lussac and Thénard are thought to have prepared impure amorphous silicon in 1811, through the heating of recently isolated potassium metal with silicon tetrafluoride, but they did not purify and characterize the product, nor identify it as a new element. Silicon was given its present name in 1817 by Scottish chemist Thomas Thomson. He retained part of Davy's name but added "-on" because he believed that silicon was a nonmetal similar to boron and carbon. In 1824, Jöns Jacob Berzelius prepared amorphous silicon using approximately the same method as Gay-Lussac (reducing potassium fluorosilicate with molten potassium metal), but purifying the product to a brown powder by repeatedly washing it. As a result, he is usually given credit for the element's discovery. The same year, Berzelius became the first to prepare silicon tetrachloride; silicon tetrafluoride had already been prepared long before in 1771 by Carl Wilhelm Scheele by dissolving silica in hydrofluoric acid. In 1823 for the first time Jacob Berzelius discovered silicon tetrachloride (SiCl4). In 1846 Von Ebelman's had synthesized Tetraethyl orthosilicate (Si(OC2H5)4).

Silicon in its more common crystalline form was not prepared until 31 years later, by Deville. By electrolyzing a mixture of sodium chloride and aluminium chloride containing approximately 10% silicon, he was able to obtain a slightly impure allotrope of silicon in 1854. Later, more cost-effective methods have been developed to isolate several allotrope forms, the most recent being silicene in 2010. Meanwhile, research on the chemistry of silicon continued; Friedrich Wöhler discovered the first volatile hydrides of silicon, synthesising trichlorosilane in 1857 and silane itself in 1858, but a detailed investigation of the silanes was only carried out in the early 20th century by Alfred Stock, despite early speculation on the matter dating as far back as the beginnings of synthetic organic chemistry in the 1830s. Similarly, the first organosilicon compound, tetraethylsilane, was synthesised by Charles Friedel and James Crafts in 1863, but detailed characterisation of organosilicon chemistry was only done in the early 20th century by Frederic Kipping.

Starting in the 1920s, the work of William Lawrence Bragg on X-ray crystallography elucidated the compositions of the silicates, which had previously been known from analytical chemistry but had not yet been understood, together with Linus Pauling's development of crystal chemistry and Victor Goldschmidt's development of geochemistry. The middle of the 20th century saw the development of the chemistry and industrial use of siloxanes and the growing use of silicone polymers, elastomers, and resins. In the late 20th century, the complexity of the crystal chemistry of silicides was mapped, along with the solid-state physics of doped semiconductors.

Silicon semiconductors
The first semiconductor devices did not use silicon, but used galena, including German physicist Ferdinand Braun's crystal detector in 1874 and Indian physicist Jagadish Chandra Bose's radio crystal detector in 1901. The first silicon semiconductor device was a silicon radio crystal detector, developed by American engineer Greenleaf Whittier Pickard in 1906.

In 1940, Russell Ohl discovered the p–n junction and photovoltaic effects in silicon. In 1941, techniques for producing high-purity germanium and silicon crystals were developed for radar microwave detector crystals during World War II. In 1947, physicist William Shockley theorized a field-effect amplifier made from germanium and silicon, but he failed to build a working device, before eventually working with germanium instead. The first working transistor was a point-contact transistor built by John Bardeen and Walter Brattain later that year while working under Shockley. In 1954, physical chemist Morris Tanenbaum fabricated the first silicon junction transistor at Bell Labs. In 1955, Carl Frosch and Lincoln Derick at Bell Labs accidentally discovered that silicon dioxide could be grown on silicon, and they later proposed this could mask silicon surfaces during diffusion processes in 1958.

Silicon Age

The "Silicon Age" refers to the late 20th century to early 21st century. This is due to silicon being the dominant material of the Silicon Age (also known as the Digital Age or Information Age), similar to how the Stone Age, Bronze Age and Iron Age were defined by the dominant materials during their respective ages of civilization.

Because silicon is an important element in high-technology semiconductor devices, many places in the world bear its name. For example, Santa Clara Valley in California acquired the nickname Silicon Valley, as the element is the base material in the semiconductor industry there. Since then, many other places have been similarly dubbed, including Silicon Wadi in Israel; Silicon Forest in Oregon; Silicon Hills in Austin, Texas; Silicon Slopes in Salt Lake City, Utah; Silicon Saxony in Germany, Silicon Valley in India, Silicon Border in Mexicali, Mexico; Silicon Fen in Cambridge, England; Silicon Roundabout in London; Silicon Glen in Scotland; Silicon Gorge in Bristol, England; Silicon Alley in New York City; and Silicon Beach in Los Angeles.

Characteristics

Physical and atomic

A silicon atom has fourteen electrons. In the ground state, they are arranged in the electron configuration [Ne]3s23p2. Of these, four are valence electrons, occupying the 3s orbital and two of the 3p orbitals. Like the other members of its group, the lighter carbon and the heavier germanium, tin, and lead, it has the same number of valence electrons as valence orbitals: hence, it can complete its octet and obtain the stable noble gas configuration of argon by forming sp3 hybrid orbitals, forming tetrahedral  derivatives where the central silicon atom shares an electron pair with each of the four atoms it is bonded to. The first four ionisation energies of silicon are 786.3, 1576.5, 3228.3, and 4354.4 kJ/mol respectively; these figures are high enough to preclude the possibility of simple cationic chemistry for the element. Following periodic trends, its single-bond covalent radius of 117.6 pm is intermediate between those of carbon (77.2 pm) and germanium (122.3 pm). The hexacoordinate ionic radius of silicon may be considered to be 40 pm, although this must be taken as a purely notional figure given the lack of a simple  cation in reality.

Electrical
At standard temperature and pressure, silicon is a shiny semiconductor with a bluish-grey metallic lustre; as typical for semiconductors, its resistivity drops as temperature rises. This arises because silicon has a small energy gap (band gap) between its highest occupied energy levels (the valence band) and the lowest unoccupied ones (the conduction band). The Fermi level is about halfway between the valence and conduction bands and is the energy at which a state is as likely to be occupied by an electron as not. Hence pure silicon is effectively an insulator at room temperature. However, doping silicon with a pnictogen such as phosphorus, arsenic, or antimony introduces one extra electron per dopant and these may then be excited into the conduction band either thermally or photolytically, creating an n-type semiconductor. Similarly, doping silicon with a group 13 element such as boron, aluminium, or gallium results in the introduction of acceptor levels that trap electrons that may be excited from the filled valence band, creating a p-type semiconductor.  Joining n-type silicon to p-type silicon creates a p–n junction with a common Fermi level; electrons flow from n to p, while holes flow from p to n, creating a voltage drop. This p–n junction thus acts as a diode that can rectify alternating current that allows current to pass more easily one way than the other. A transistor is an n–p–n junction, with a thin layer of weakly p-type silicon between two n-type regions. Biasing the emitter through a small forward voltage and the collector through a large reverse voltage allows the transistor to act as a triode amplifier.

Crystal structure
Silicon crystallises in a giant covalent structure at standard conditions, specifically in a diamond cubic lattice (space group 227). It thus has a high melting point of 1414 °C, as a lot of energy is required to break the strong covalent bonds and melt the solid. Upon melting silicon contracts as the long-range tetrahedral network of bonds breaks up and the voids in that network are filled in, similar to water ice when hydrogen bonds are broken upon melting. It does not have any thermodynamically stable allotropes at standard pressure, but several other crystal structures are known at higher pressures. The general trend is one of increasing coordination number with pressure, culminating in a hexagonal close-packed allotrope at about 40 gigapascals known as Si–VII (the standard modification being Si–I). An allotrope called BC8 (or bc8), having a body-centred cubic lattice with eight atoms per primitive unit cell (space group 206), can be created at high pressure and remains metastable at low pressure. Its properties have been studied in detail.

Silicon boils at 3265 °C: this, while high, is still lower than the temperature at which its lighter congener carbon sublimes (3642 °C) and silicon similarly has a lower heat of vaporisation than carbon, consistent with the fact that the Si–Si bond is weaker than the C–C bond.

It is also possible to construct silicene layers analogous to graphene.

Isotopes

Naturally occurring silicon is composed of three stable isotopes, 28Si (92.23%), 29Si (4.67%), and 30Si (3.10%). Out of these, only 29Si is of use in NMR and EPR spectroscopy, as it is the only one with a nuclear spin (I =). All three are produced in Type Ia supernovae through the oxygen-burning process, with 28Si being made as part of the alpha process and hence the most abundant. The fusion of 28Si with alpha particles by photodisintegration rearrangement in stars is known as the silicon-burning process; it is the last stage of stellar nucleosynthesis before the rapid collapse and violent explosion of the star in question in a type II supernova.

Twenty radioisotopes have been characterized, the two stablest being 32Si with a half-life of about 150 years, and 31Si with a half-life of 2.62 hours. All the remaining radioactive isotopes have half-lives that are less than seven seconds, and the majority of these have half-lives that are less than one tenth of a second. Silicon has one known nuclear isomer, 34mSi, with a half-life less than 210 nanoseconds. 32Si undergoes low-energy beta decay to 32P and then stable 32S. 31Si may be produced by the neutron activation of natural silicon and is thus useful for quantitative analysis; it can be easily detected by its characteristic beta decay to stable 31P, in which the emitted electron carries up to 1.48 MeV of energy.

The known isotopes of silicon range in mass number from 22 to 44. The most common decay mode of the isotopes with mass numbers lower than the three stable isotopes is inverse beta decay, primarily forming aluminium isotopes (13 protons) as decay products. The most common decay mode for the heavier unstable isotopes is beta decay, primarily forming phosphorus isotopes (15 protons) as decay products.

Silicon can enter the oceans through groundwater and riverine transport. Large fluxes of groundwater input have an isotopic composition which is distinct from riverine silicon inputs. Isotopic variations in groundwater and riverine transports contribute to variations in oceanic 30Si values. Currently, there are substantial differences in the isotopic values of deep water in the world's ocean basins. Between the Atlantic and Pacific oceans, there is a deep water 30Si gradient of greater than 0.3 parts per thousand. 30Si is most commonly associated with productivity in the oceans.

Chemistry and compounds

Crystalline bulk silicon is rather inert, but becomes more reactive at high temperatures. Like its neighbour aluminium, silicon forms a thin, continuous surface layer of silicon dioxide that protects the metal from oxidation. Silicon reacts with gaseous sulfur at 600 °C and gaseous phosphorus at 1000 °C. This oxide layer nevertheless does not prevent reaction with the halogens; fluorine attacks silicon vigorously at room temperature, chlorine does so at about 300 °C, and bromine and iodine at about 500 °C. Silicon does not react with most aqueous acids, but is oxidised and complexed by hydrofluoric acid mixtures containing either chlorine or nitric acid to form hexafluorosilicates. It readily dissolves in hot aqueous alkali to form silicates. At high temperatures, silicon also reacts with alkyl halides; this reaction may be catalysed by copper to directly synthesise organosilicon chlorides as precursors to silicone polymers. Upon melting, silicon becomes extremely reactive, alloying with most metals to form silicides, and reducing most metal oxides because the heat of formation of silicon dioxide is so large. In fact, molten silicon reacts virtually with every known kind of crucible material (except its own oxide). This happens due to silicon's high binding forces for the light elements and to its high dissolving power for most elements. As a result, containers for liquid silicon must be made of refractory, unreactive materials such as zirconium dioxide or group 4, 5, and 6 borides.

Tetrahedral coordination is a major structural motif in silicon chemistry just as it is for carbon chemistry. However, the 3p subshell is rather more diffuse than the 2p subshell and does not hybridise so well with the 3s subshell. As a result, the chemistry of silicon and its heavier congeners shows significant differences from that of carbon, and thus octahedral coordination is also significant. For example, the electronegativity of silicon (1.90) is much less than that of carbon (2.55), because the valence electrons of silicon are further from the nucleus than those of carbon and hence experience smaller electrostatic forces of attraction from the nucleus. The poor overlap of 3p orbitals also results in a much lower tendency toward catenation (formation of Si–Si bonds) for silicon than for carbon, due to the concomitant weakening of the Si–Si bond compared to the C–C bond: the average Si–Si bond energy is approximately 226 kJ/mol, compared to a value of 356 kJ/mol for the C–C bond. This results in multiply bonded silicon compounds generally being much less stable than their carbon counterparts, an example of the double bond rule. Lastly, because of the increasing energy gap between the valence s and p orbitals as the group is descended, the divalent state grows in importance from carbon to lead, so that a few unstable divalent compounds are known for silicon; this lowering of the main oxidation state, in tandem with increasing atomic radii, results in an increase of metallic character down the group. Silicon already shows some incipient metallic behavior, particularly in the behavior of its oxide compounds and its reaction with acids as well as bases (though this takes some effort), and is hence often referred to as a metalloid rather than a nonmetal. However, metallicity does not become clear in group 14 until germanium and dominant until tin, with the growing importance of the lower +2 oxidation state.

Silicon shows clear differences from carbon. For example, organic chemistry has very few analogies with silicon chemistry, while silicate minerals have a structural complexity unseen in oxocarbons. Silicon tends to resemble germanium far more than it does carbon, and this resemblance is enhanced by the d-block contraction, resulting in the size of the germanium atom being much closer to that of the silicon atom than periodic trends would predict. Nevertheless, there are still some differences because of the growing importance of the divalent state in germanium compared to silicon, which result in germanium being significantly more metallic than silicon. Additionally, the lower Ge–O bond strength compared to the Si–O bond strength results in the absence of "germanone" polymers that would be analogous to silicone polymers.

Silicides

Many metal silicides are known, most of which have formulae that cannot be explained through simple appeals to valence: their bonding ranges from metallic to ionic and covalent. They are structurally more similar to the borides than the carbides, in keeping with the diagonal relationship between boron and silicon, although the larger size of silicon than boron means that exact structural analogies are few and far between. The heats of formation of the silicides are usually similar to those of the borides and carbides of the same elements, but they usually melt at lower temperatures. Silicides are known for all stable elements in groups 1–10, with the exception of beryllium: in particular, uranium and the transition metals of groups 4–10 show the widest range of stoichiometries. Except for copper, the metals in groups 11–15 do not form silicides. Instead, most form eutectic mixtures, although the heaviest post-transition metals mercury, thallium, lead, and bismuth are completely immiscible with liquid silicon.

Usually, silicides are prepared by direct reaction of the elements. For example, the alkali metals and alkaline earth metals react with silicon or silicon oxide to give silicides. Nevertheless, even with these highly electropositive elements true silicon anions are not obtainable, and most of these compounds are semiconductors. For example, the alkali metal silicides  contain pyramidal tricoordinate silicon in the  anion, isoelectronic with white phosphorus, . Metal-rich silicides tend to have isolated silicon atoms (e. g. ); with increasing silicon content, catenation increases, resulting in isolated clusters of two (e. g. ) or four silicon atoms (e. g. ) at first, followed by chains (e. g. CaSi), layers (e. g. ), or three-dimensional networks of silicon atoms spanning space (e. g. ) as the silicon content rises even higher.

The silicides of the group 1 and 2 metals usually are more reactive than the transition metal silicides. The latter usually do not react with aqueous reagents, except for hydrofluoric acid; however, they do react with much more aggressive reagents such as liquid potassium hydroxide, or gaseous fluorine or chlorine when red-hot. The pre-transition metal silicides instead readily react with water and aqueous acids, usually producing hydrogen or silanes:
 + 3  →  + 3 
 + 2  → 2  + 
Products often vary with the stoichiometry of the silicide reactant. For example,  is polar and non-conducting and has the anti- structure with single isolated silicon atoms, and reacts with water to produce calcium hydroxide, hydrated silicon dioxide, and hydrogen gas. CaSi with its zigzag chains of silicon atoms instead reacts to give silanes and polymeric , while  with its puckered layers of silicon atoms does not react with water, but will react with dilute hydrochloric acid: the product is a yellow polymeric solid with stoichiometry .

Silanes

Speculation on silicon hydride chemistry started in the 1830s, contemporary with the development of synthetic organic chemistry. Disilane ) followed in 1902, when it was first made by Henri Moissan and Samuel Smiles by the protonolysis of magnesium silicides. Further investigation had to wait until 1916 because of the great reactivity and thermal instability of the silanes; it was then that Alfred Stock began to study silicon hydrides in earnest with new greaseless vacuum techniques, as they were found as contaminants of his focus, the boron hydrides. The names silanes and boranes are his, based on analogy with the alkanes. The Moissan and Smiles method of preparation of silanes and silane derivatives via protonolysis of metal silicides is still used, although the yield is lowered by the hydrolysis of the products that occurs simultaneously, so that the preferred route today is to treat substituted silanes with hydride reducing agents such as lithium aluminium hydride in etheric solutions at low temperatures. Direct reaction of HX or RX with silicon, possibly with a catalyst such as copper, is also a viable method of producing substituted silanes.

They are all strong reducing agents. The first two, silane and disilane, are colourless gases; the heavier members of the series are volatile liquids. All silanes are very reactive and catch fire or explode spontaneously in air. They become less thermally stable with room temperature, so that only silane is indefinitely stable at room temperature, although disilane does not decompose very quickly (only 2.5% of a sample decomposes after the passage of eight months). They decompose to form polymeric polysilicon hydride and hydrogen gas. As expected from the difference in atomic weight, the silanes are less volatile than the corresponding alkanes and boranes, but more so than the corresponding germanes. They are much more reactive than the corresponding alkanes, because of the larger radius of silicon compared to carbon facilitating nucleophilic attack at the silicon, the greater polarity of the Si–H bond compared to the C–H bond, and the ability of silicon to expand its octet and hence form adducts and lower the reaction's activation energy.

Silane pyrolysis gives polymeric species and finally elemental silicon and hydrogen; indeed ultrapure silicon is commercially produced by the pyrolysis of silane. While the thermal decomposition of alkanes starts by the breaking of a C–H or C–C bond and the formation of radical intermediates, polysilanes decompose by eliminating silylenes : or :SiHR, as the activation energy of this process (~210 kJ/mol) is much less than the Si–Si and Si–H bond energies. While pure silanes do not react with pure water or dilute acids, traces of alkali catalyse immediate hydrolysis to hydrated silicon dioxide. The Si–H bond also adds to alkenes, a reaction which proceeds slowly and speeds up with increasing substitution of the silane involved. At 450 °C, silane participates in an addition reaction with acetone, as well as a ring-opening reaction with ethylene oxide. Direct reaction of the silanes with chlorine or bromine results in explosions at room temperature, but the reaction of silane with bromine at −80 °C is controlled and yields bromosilane and dibromosilane. The monohalosilanes may be formed by reacting silane with the appropriate hydrogen halide with an  catalyst, or by reacting silane with a solid silver halide in a heated flow reactor:
 + 2 AgCl   + HCl + 2 Ag
Among the derivatives of silane, iodosilane and potassium silanide are very useful synthetic intermediates in the production of more complicated silicon-containing compounds: the latter is a colourless crystalline ionic solid containing K+ cations and  anions in the NaCl structure, and is made by the reduction of silane by potassium metal. Additionally, the reactive hypervalent species  is also known. With suitable organic substituents it is possible to produce stable polysilanes: they have surprisingly high electric conductivities, arising from sigma delocalisation of the electrons in the chain.

Halides
Silicon and silicon carbide readily react with all four stable halogens, forming the colourless, reactive, and volatile silicon tetrahalides Silicon tetrafluoride also may be made by fluorinating the other silicon halides, and is produced by the attack of hydrofluoric acid on glass. Heating two different tetrahalides together also produces a random mixture of mixed halides, which may also be produced by halogen exchange reactions. The shift from the hypoelectronic elements in Group 13 and earlier to the Group 14 elements is illustrated by the change from an infinite ionic structure in aluminium fluoride to a lattice of simple covalent silicon tetrafluoride molecules, as dictated by the lower electronegativity of aluminium than silicon, the stoichiometry (the +4 oxidation state being too high for true ionicity), and the smaller size of the silicon atom compared to the aluminium atom.

Silicon tetrachloride is manufactured on a huge scale as a precursor to the production of pure silicon, silicon dioxide, and some silicon esters. The silicon tetrahalides hydrolyse readily in water, unlike the carbon tetrahalides, again because of the larger size of the silicon atom rendering it more open to nucleophilic attack and the ability of the silicon atom to expand its octet which carbon lacks. The reaction of silicon tetrafluoride with excess hydrofluoric acid produces the octahedral hexafluorosilicate anion .

Analogous to the silanes, halopolysilanes  also are known. A suggested explanation for this phenomenon is the compensation for the electron loss of silicon to the more electronegative halogen atoms by pi backbonding from the filled pπ orbitals on the halogen atoms to the empty dπ orbitals on silicon: this is similar to the situation of carbon monoxide in metal carbonyl complexes and explains their stability. These halopolysilanes may be produced by comproportionation of silicon tetrahalides with elemental silicon, or by condensation of lighter halopolysilanes (trimethylammonium being a useful catalyst for this reaction).

Silica
Silicon dioxide, also known as silica, is one of the best-studied compounds, second only to water. Twelve different crystal modifications of silica are known, the most common being α-quartz, a major constituent of many rocks such as granite and sandstone. It also is known to occur in a pure form as rock crystal; impure forms are known as rose quartz, smoky quartz, morion, amethyst, and citrine. Some poorly crystalline forms of quartz are also known, such as chalcedony, chrysoprase, carnelian, agate, onyx, jasper, heliotrope, and flint. Other modifications of silicon dioxide are known in some other minerals such as tridymite and cristobalite, as well as the much less common coesite and stishovite. Biologically generated forms are also known as kieselguhr and diatomaceous earth. Vitreous silicon dioxide is known as tektites, and obsidian, and rarely as lechatelierite. Some synthetic forms are known as keatite. Opals are composed of complicated crystalline aggregates of partially hydrated silicon dioxide.

Most crystalline forms of silica are made of infinite arrangements of SiO|4 tetrahedra (with Si at the center) connected at their corners, with each oxygen atom linked to two silicon atoms. In the thermodynamically stable room-temperature form, α-quartz, these tetrahedra are linked in intertwined helical chains with two different Si–O distances (159.7 and 161.7 pm) with a Si–O–Si angle of 144°. These helices can be either left- or right-handed, so that individual α-quartz crystals are optically active. At 537 °C, this transforms quickly and reversibly into the similar β-quartz, with a change of the Si–O–Si angle to 155° but a retention of handedness. Further heating to 867 °C results in another reversible phase transition to β-tridymite, in which some Si–O bonds are broken to allow for the arrangement of the SiO|4 tetrahedra into a more open and less dense hexagonal structure. This transition is slow and hence tridymite occurs as a metastable mineral even below this transition temperature; when cooled to about 120 °C it quickly and reversibly transforms by slight displacements of individual silicon and oxygen atoms to α-tridymite, similarly to the transition from α-quartz to β-quartz. β-tridymite slowly transforms to cubic β-cristobalite at about 1470 °C, which once again exists metastably below this transition temperature and transforms at 200–280 °C to α-cristobalite via small atomic displacements. β-cristobalite melts at 1713 °C; the freezing of silica from the melt is quite slow and vitrification, or the formation of a glass, is likely to occur instead. In vitreous silica, the SiO|4 tetrahedra remain corner-connected, but the symmetry and periodicity of the crystalline forms are lost. Because of the slow conversions between these three forms, it is possible upon rapid heating to melt β-quartz (1550 °C) or β-tridymite (1703 °C). Silica boils at approximately 2800 °C. Other high-pressure forms of silica are known, such as coesite and stishovite: these are known in nature, formed under the shock pressure of a meteorite impact and then rapidly quenched to preserve the crystal structure. Similar melting and cooling of silica occurs following lightning strikes, forming glassy lechatelierite. W-silica is an unstable low-density form involving SiO|4 tetrahedra sharing opposite edges instead of corners, forming parallel chains similarly to silicon disulfide and silicon diselenide: it quickly returns to forming amorphous silica with heat or traces of water

Silica is rather inert chemically. It is not attacked by any acids other than hydrofluoric acid. However, it slowly dissolves in hot concentrated alkalis, and does so rather quickly in fused metal hydroxides or carbonates, to give metal silicates. Among the elements, it is attacked only by fluorine at room temperature to form silicon tetrafluoride: hydrogen and carbon also react, but require temperatures over 1000 °C to do so. Silica nevertheless reacts with many metal and metalloid oxides to form a wide variety of compounds important in the glass and ceramic industries above all, but also have many other uses: for example, sodium silicate is often used in detergents due to its buffering, saponifying, and emulsifying properties

Silicic acids
Adding water to silica drops its melting point by around 800 °C due to the breaking of the structure by replacing Si–O–Si linkages with terminating Si–OH groups. Increasing water concentration results in the formation of hydrated silica gels and colloidal silica dispersions. Many hydrates and silicic acids exist in the most dilute of aqueous solutions, but these are rather insoluble and quickly precipitate and condense and cross-link to form various polysilicic acids of variable combinations following the formula , similar to the behaviour of boron, aluminium, and iron, among other elements. Hence, although some simple silicic acids have been identified in dilute solutions, such as orthosilicic acid  and metasilicic acid , none of these are likely to exist in the solid state.

Silicate minerals

About 95% of the Earth's crustal rocks are made of silica or silicate and aluminosilicate minerals, as reflected in oxygen, silicon, and aluminium being the three most common elements in the crust (in that order). Measured by mass, silicon makes up 27.7% of the Earth's crust. Pure silicon crystals are very rarely found in nature, but notable exceptions are crystals as large as to 0.3 mm across found during sampling gases from the Kudriavy volcano on Iturup, one of the Kuril Islands.

Silicate and aluminosilicate minerals have many different structures and varying stoichiometry, but they may be classified following some general principles. Tetrahedral SiO|4 units are common to almost all these compounds, either as discrete structures, or combined into larger units by the sharing of corner oxygen atoms. These may be divided into neso-silicates (discrete SiO|4 units) sharing no oxygen atoms, soro-silicates (discrete Si|2|O|7 units) sharing one, cyclo-silicates (closed ring structures) and ino-silicates (continuous chain or ribbon structures) both sharing two, phyllo-silicates (continuous sheets) sharing three, and tecto-silicates (continuous three-dimensional frameworks) sharing four. The lattice of oxygen atoms that results is usually close-packed, or close to it, with the charge being balanced by other cations in various different polyhedral sites according to size.

(phenacite) is unusual as both BeII and SiIV occupy tetrahedral four-coordinated sites; the other divalent cations instead occupy six-coordinated octahedral sites and often isomorphously replace each other as in olivine, . Zircon, demands eight-coordination of the ZrIV cations due to stoichiometry and because of their larger ionic radius (84 pm). Also significant are the garnets, [MM(SiO)], in which the divalent cations (e.g. Ca, Mg, Fe) are eight-coordinated and the trivalent ones are six-coordinated (e.g. Al, Cr, Fe). Soro-silicates, involving discrete double or triple tetrahedral units, are quite rare: metasilicates involving cyclic "2n−" units of corner-abutting tetrahedra forming a polygonal ring are also known.

Chain metasilicates, {SiO}, form by corner-sharing of an indefinite chain of linked SiO|4 tetrahedra. Many differences arise due to the differing repeat distances of conformation across the line of tetrahedra. A repeat distance of two is most common, as in most pyroxene minerals, but repeat distances of one, three, four, five, six, seven, nine, and twelve are also known. These chains may then link across each other to form double chains and ribbons, as in the asbestos minerals, involving repeated chains of cyclic tetrahedron rings.

Layer silicates, such as the clay minerals and the micas, are very common, and often are formed by horizontal cross-linking of metasilicate chains or planar condensation of smaller units. Three-dimensional framework aluminosilicates are structurally very complex; they may be conceived of as starting from the  structure, but having replaced up to one-half of the SiIV atoms with AlIII, they require more cations to be included in the structure to balance charge. Examples include feldspars (the most abundant minerals on the Earth), zeolites, and ultramarines. Many feldspars can be thought of as forming part of the ternary system . Their lattice is destroyed by high pressure prompting AlIII to undergo six-coordination rather than four-coordination, and this reaction destroying feldspars may be a reason for the Mohorovičić discontinuity, which would imply that the crust and mantle have the same chemical composition, but different lattices, although this is not a universally held view. Zeolites have many polyhedral cavities in their frameworks (truncated cuboctahedra being most common, but other polyhedra also are known as zeolite cavities), allowing them to include loosely bound molecules such as water in their structure.

Other inorganic compounds
Silicon disulfide is formed by burning silicon in gaseous sulfur at 100 °C; sublimation of the resulting compound in nitrogen results in white, flexible long fibers reminiscent of asbestos with a structure similar to W-silica. This melts at 1090 °C and sublimes at 1250 °C; at high temperature and pressure this transforms to a crystal structure analogous to cristobalite. It is also ammonolysed quickly and completely by liquid ammonia as follows to form an imide:
 + 4  →  + 2 
It reacts with the sulfides of sodium, magnesium, aluminium, and iron to form metal thiosilicates: reaction with ethanol results in tetraethylsilicate  and hydrogen sulfide. Ethylsilicate is useful as its controlled hydrolysis produces adhesive or film-like forms of silica. Despite the double bond rule, stable organosilanethiones RR'Si=S have been made thanks to the stabilising mechanism of intermolecular coordination via an amine group.

Silicon nitride, may be formed by directly reacting silicon with nitrogen above 1300 °C, but a more economical means of production is by heating silica and coke in a stream of nitrogen and hydrogen gas at 1500 °C. It would make a promising ceramic if not for the difficulty of working with and sintering it: chemically, it is near-totally inert, and even above 1000 °C it keeps its strength, shape, and continues to be resistant to wear and corrosion. It is very hard (9 on the Mohs hardness scale), dissociates only at 1900 °C at 1 atm, and is quite dense (density 3.185 g/cm3), because of its compact structure similar to that of phenacite.

Reacting silyl halides with ammonia or alkylammonia derivatives in the gaseous phase or in ethanolic solution produces various volatile silylamides, which are silicon analogues of the amines:
3  + 4  →  + 3 
 + 2  →  + 
4  + 5  →  + 4 

Many such compounds have been prepared, the only known restriction being that the nitrogen is always tertiary, and species containing the SiH–NH group are unstable at room temperature. Similarly, trisilylamines are weaker as ligands than their carbon analogues, the tertiary amines, although substitution of some  groups by  groups mitigates this weakness. Some silicon analogues of imines, with a Si=N double bond, are known: the first found was But2Si=N–SiBut3, which was discovered in 1986.

Silicon carbide (SiC) was first made by Edward Goodrich Acheson in 1891, who named it carborundum to reference its intermediate hardness and abrasive power between diamond (an allotrope of carbon) and corundum (aluminium oxide). He soon founded a company to manufacture it, and today about one million tonnes are produced each year. Silicon carbide exists in about 250 crystalline forms. The polymorphism of SiC is characterized by a large family of similar crystalline structures called polytypes. They are variations of the same chemical compound that are identical in two dimensions and differ in the third. Thus they can be viewed as layers stacked in a certain sequence. It is made industrially by reduction of quartz sand with excess coke or anthracite at 2000–2500 °C in an electric furnace:
 + 2 C → Si + 2 CO
Si + C → SiC

It is the most thermally stable binary silicon compound, only decomposing through loss of silicon starting from around 2700 °C. It is resistant to most aqueous acids, phosphoric acid being an exception. It forms a protective layer of silicon dioxide on the surface and hence only oxidises appreciably in air above 1000 °C; removal of this layer by molten hydroxides or carbonates leads to quick oxidation. It is also useful as an intrinsic semiconductor, as well as an extrinsic semiconductor upon being doped. In its diamond-like behavior it serves as an illustration of the chemical similarity between carbon and silicon.

Organosilicon compounds

Because the Si–C bond is close in strength to the C–C bond, organosilicon compounds tend to be markedly thermally and chemically stable. Furthermore, since carbon and silicon are chemical congeners, organosilicon chemistry shows some significant similarities with carbon chemistry, for example in the propensity of such compounds for catenation and forming multiple bonds. However, significant differences also arise: since silicon is more electropositive than carbon, bonds to more electronegative elements are generally stronger with silicon than with carbon, and vice versa. Thus the Si–F bond is significantly stronger than even the C–F bond and is one of the strongest single bonds, while the Si–H bond is much weaker than the C–H bond and is readily broken. Furthermore, the ability of silicon to expand its octet is not shared by carbon, and hence some organosilicon reactions have no organic analogues. For example, nucleophilic attack on silicon does not proceed by the SN2 or SN1 processes, but instead goes through a negatively charged true pentacoordinate intermediate and appears like a substitution at a hindered tertiary atom. This works for silicon, unlike for carbon, because the long Si–C bonds reduce the steric hindrance and there are no geometric constraints for nucleophilic attack, unlike for example a C–O σ* antibonding orbital. Nevertheless, despite these differences, the mechanism is still often called "SN2 at silicon" for simplicity.

One of the most useful silicon-containing groups is trimethylsilyl, . The Si–C bond connecting it to the rest of the molecule is reasonably strong, allowing it to remain while the rest of the molecule undergoes reactions, but is not so strong that it cannot be removed specifically when needed, for example by the fluoride ion, which is a very weak nucleophile for carbon compounds but a very strong one for organosilicon compounds. It may be compared to acidic protons; while trisilylmethyl is removed by hard nucleophiles instead of bases, both removals usually promote elimination. As a general rule, while saturated carbon is best attacked by nucleophiles that are neutral compounds, those based on nonmetals far down on the periodic table (e.g. sulfur, selenium, or iodine), or even both, silicon is best attacked by charged nucleophiles, particularly those involving such highly electronegative nonmetals as oxygen, fluorine, or chlorine. For example, enolates react at the carbon in haloalkanes, but at the oxygen in silyl chlorides; and when trimethylsilyl is removed from an organic molecule using hydroxide as a nucleophile, the product of the reaction is not the silanol as one would expect from using carbon chemistry as an analogy, because the siloxide is strongly nucleophilic and attacks the original molecule to yield the silyl ether hexamethyldisiloxane, . Conversely, while the SN2 reaction is mostly unaffected by the presence of a partial positive charge (δ+) at the carbon, the analogous "SN2" reaction at silicon is so affected. Thus, for example, the silyl triflates are so electrophilic that they react 108 to 109 times faster than silyl chlorides with oxygen-containing nucleophiles. Trimethylsilyl triflate is in particular a very good Lewis acid and is used to convert carbonyl compounds to acetals and silyl enol ethers, reacting them together analogously to the aldol reaction.

Si–C bonds are commonly formed in three ways. In the laboratory, preparation is often carried out in small quantities by reacting tetrachlorosilane (silicon tetrachloride) with organolithium, Grignard, or organoaluminium reagents, or by catalytic addition of Si–H across C=C double bonds. The second route has the drawback of not being applicable to the most important silanes, the methyl and phenyl silanes. Organosilanes are made industrially by directly reacting alkyl or aryl halides with silicon with 10% by weight metallic copper as a catalyst. Standard organic reactions suffice to produce many derivatives; the resulting organosilanes are often significantly more reactive than their carbon congeners, readily undergoing hydrolysis, ammonolysis, alcoholysis, and condensation to form cyclic oligomers or linear polymers.

Silicone polymers

The word "silicone" was first used by Frederic Kipping in 1901.

Silicones may be considered analogous to mineral silicates, in which the methyl groups of the silicones correspond to the isoelectronic < of the silicates. They are quite stable to extreme temperatures, oxidation, and water, and have useful dielectric, antistick, and antifoam properties. Furthermore, they are resistant over long periods of time to ultraviolet radiation and weathering, and are inert physiologically. They are fairly unreactive, but do react with concentrated solutions bearing the hydroxide ion and fluorinating agents, and occasionally, may even be used as mild reagents for selective syntheses.

Occurrence

Silicon is the eighth most abundant element in the universe, coming after hydrogen, helium, carbon, nitrogen, oxygen, iron, and neon. These abundances are not replicated well on Earth due to substantial separation of the elements taking place during the formation of the Solar System. Silicon makes up 27.2% of the Earth's crust by weight, second only to oxygen at 45.5%, with which it always is associated in nature. Further fractionation took place in the formation of the Earth by planetary differentiation: Earth's core, which makes up 31.5% of the mass of the Earth, has approximate composition ; the mantle makes up 68.1% of the Earth's mass and is composed mostly of denser oxides and silicates, an example being olivine, ; while the lighter siliceous minerals such as aluminosilicates rise to the surface and form the crust, making up 0.4% of the Earth's mass.

The crystallisation of igneous rocks from magma depends on a number of factors; among them are the chemical composition of the magma, the cooling rate, and some properties of the individual minerals to be formed, such as lattice energy, melting point, and complexity of their crystal structure. As magma is cooled, olivine appears first, followed by pyroxene, amphibole, biotite mica, orthoclase feldspar, muscovite mica, quartz, zeolites, and finally, hydrothermal minerals. This sequence shows a trend toward increasingly complex silicate units with cooling, and the introduction of hydroxide and fluoride anions in addition to oxides. Many metals may substitute for silicon. After these igneous rocks undergo weathering, transport, and deposition, sedimentary rocks like clay, shale, and sandstone are formed. Metamorphism also may occur at high temperatures and pressures, creating an even vaster variety of minerals.

There are four sources for silicon fluxes into the ocean include chemical weathering of continental rocks, river transport, dissolution of continental terrigenous silicates, and through the reaction between submarine basalts and hydrothermal fluid which release dissolved silicon. All four of these fluxes are interconnected in the ocean's biogeochemical cycle as they all were initially formed from the weathering of Earth's crust.

Approximately 300–900 megatonnes of Aeolian dust is deposited into the world's oceans each year. Of that value, 80–240 megatonnes are in the form of particulate silicon. The total amount of particulate silicon deposition into the ocean is still less than the amount of silicon influx into the ocean via riverine transportation. Aeolian inputs of particulate lithogenic silicon into the North Atlantic and Western North Pacific oceans are the result of dust settling on the oceans from the Sahara and Gobi Desert, respectively. Riverine transports are the major source of silicon influx into the ocean in coastal regions, while silicon deposition in the open ocean is greatly influenced by the settling of Aeolian dust.

Production
Silicon of 96–99% purity is made by reducing quartzite or sand with highly pure coke. The reduction is carried out in an electric arc furnace, with an excess of  used to stop silicon carbide (SiC) from accumulating:
 + 2 C → Si + 2 CO
2 SiC +  → 3 Si + 2 CO

This reaction, known as carbothermal reduction of silicon dioxide, usually is conducted in the presence of scrap iron with low amounts of phosphorus and sulfur, producing ferrosilicon. Ferrosilicon, an iron-silicon alloy that contains varying ratios of elemental silicon and iron, accounts for about 80% of the world's production of elemental silicon, with China, the leading supplier of elemental silicon, providing 4.6 million tonnes (or 2/3rds of world output) of silicon, most of it in the form of ferrosilicon. It is followed by Russia (610,000 t), Norway (330,000 t), Brazil (240,000 t), and the United States (170,000 t). Ferrosilicon is primarily used by the iron and steel industry (see below) with primary use as alloying addition in iron or steel and for de-oxidation of steel in integrated steel plants.

Another reaction, sometimes used, is aluminothermal reduction of silicon dioxide, as follows:
3  + 4 Al → 3 Si + 2 

Leaching powdered 96–97% pure silicon with water results in ~98.5% pure silicon, which is used in the chemical industry. However, even greater purity is needed for semiconductor applications, and this is produced from the reduction of tetrachlorosilane (silicon tetrachloride) or trichlorosilane. The former is made by chlorinating scrap silicon and the latter is a byproduct of silicone production. These compounds are volatile and hence can be purified by repeated fractional distillation, followed by reduction to elemental silicon with very pure zinc metal as the reducing agent. The spongy pieces of silicon thus produced are melted and then grown to form cylindrical single crystals, before being purified by zone refining. Other routes use the thermal decomposition of silane or tetraiodosilane. Another process used is the reduction of sodium hexafluorosilicate, a common waste product of the phosphate fertilizer industry, by metallic sodium: this is highly exothermic and hence requires no outside energy source. Hyperfine silicon is made at a higher purity than almost any other material: transistor production requires impurity levels in silicon crystals less than 1 part per 1010, and in special cases impurity levels below 1 part per 1012 are needed and attained.

Silicon nanostructures can directly be produced from silica sand using conventional metalothermic processes, or the combustion synthesis approach. Such nanostructured silicon materials can be used in various functional applications including the anode of lithium ion batteries (LIBs) or phorocatalytic applications.

Applications

Compounds
Most silicon is used industrially without being purified, and indeed, often with comparatively little processing from its natural form. More than 90% of the Earth's crust is composed of silicate minerals, which are compounds of silicon and oxygen, often with metallic ions when negatively charged silicate anions require cations to balance the charge. Many of these have direct commercial uses, such as clays, silica sand, and most kinds of building stone. Thus, the vast majority of uses for silicon are as structural compounds, either as the silicate minerals or silica (crude silicon dioxide). Silicates are used in making Portland cement (made mostly of calcium silicates) which is used in building mortar and modern stucco, but more importantly, combined with silica sand, and gravel (usually containing silicate minerals such as granite), to make the concrete that is the basis of most of the very largest industrial building projects of the modern world.

Silica is used to make fire brick, a type of ceramic. Silicate minerals are also in whiteware ceramics, an important class of products usually containing various types of fired clay minerals (natural aluminium phyllosilicates). An example is porcelain, which is based on the silicate mineral kaolinite. Traditional glass (silica-based soda-lime glass) also functions in many of the same ways, and also is used for windows and containers. In addition, specialty silica based glass fibers are used for optical fiber, as well as to produce fiberglass for structural support and glass wool for thermal insulation.

Silicones often are used in waterproofing treatments, molding compounds, mold-release agents, mechanical seals, high temperature greases and waxes, and caulking compounds. Silicone is also sometimes used in breast implants, contact lenses, explosives and pyrotechnics. Silly Putty was originally made by adding boric acid to silicone oil. Other silicon compounds function as high-technology abrasives and new high-strength ceramics based upon silicon carbide. Silicon is a component of some superalloys.

Alloys 
Elemental silicon is added to molten cast iron as ferrosilicon or silicocalcium alloys to improve performance in casting thin sections and to prevent the formation of cementite where exposed to outside air. The presence of elemental silicon in molten iron acts as a sink for oxygen, so that the steel carbon content, which must be kept within narrow limits for each type of steel, can be more closely controlled. Ferrosilicon production and use is a monitor of the steel industry, and although this form of elemental silicon is grossly impure, it accounts for 80% of the world's use of free silicon. Silicon is an important constituent of electrical steel, modifying its resistivity and ferromagnetic properties.

The properties of silicon may be used to modify alloys with metals other than iron. "Metallurgical grade" silicon is silicon of 95–99% purity. About 55% of the world consumption of metallurgical purity silicon goes for production of aluminium-silicon alloys (silumin alloys) for aluminium part casts, mainly for use in the automotive industry. Silicon's importance in aluminium casting is that a significantly high amount (12%) of silicon in aluminium forms a eutectic mixture which solidifies with very little thermal contraction. This greatly reduces tearing and cracks formed from stress as casting alloys cool to solidity. Silicon also significantly improves the hardness and thus wear-resistance of aluminium.

Electronics

Most elemental silicon produced remains as a ferrosilicon alloy, and only approximately 20% is refined to metallurgical grade purity (a total of 1.3–1.5 million metric tons/year). An estimated 15% of the world production of metallurgical grade silicon is further refined to semiconductor purity. This typically is the "nine-9" or 99.9999999% purity, nearly defect-free single crystalline material.

Monocrystalline silicon of such purity is usually produced by the Czochralski process, and is used to produce silicon wafers used in the semiconductor industry, in electronics, and in some high-cost and high-efficiency photovoltaic applications. Pure silicon is an intrinsic semiconductor, which means that unlike metals, it conducts electron holes and electrons released from atoms by heat; silicon's electrical conductivity increases with higher temperatures. Pure silicon has too low a conductivity (i.e., too high a resistivity) to be used as a circuit element in electronics. In practice, pure silicon is doped with small concentrations of certain other elements, which greatly increase its conductivity and adjust its electrical response by controlling the number and charge (positive or negative) of activated carriers. Such control is necessary for transistors, solar cells, semiconductor detectors, and other semiconductor devices used in the computer industry and other technical applications. In silicon photonics, silicon may be used as a continuous wave Raman laser medium to produce coherent light.

In common integrated circuits, a wafer of monocrystalline silicon serves as a mechanical support for the circuits, which are created by doping and insulated from each other by thin layers of silicon oxide, an insulator that is easily produced on Si surfaces by processes of thermal oxidation or local oxidation (LOCOS), which involve exposing the element to oxygen under the proper conditions that can be predicted by the Deal–Grove model. Silicon has become the most popular material for both high power semiconductors and integrated circuits because it can withstand the highest temperatures and greatest electrical activity without suffering avalanche breakdown (an electron avalanche is created when heat produces free electrons and holes, which in turn pass more current, which produces more heat). In addition, the insulating oxide of silicon is not soluble in water, which gives it an advantage over germanium (an element with similar properties which can also be used in semiconductor devices) in certain fabrication techniques.

Monocrystalline silicon is expensive to produce, and is usually justified only in production of integrated circuits, where tiny crystal imperfections can interfere with tiny circuit paths. For other uses, other types of pure silicon may be employed. These include hydrogenated amorphous silicon and upgraded metallurgical-grade silicon (UMG-Si) used in the production of low-cost, large-area electronics in applications such as liquid crystal displays and of large-area, low-cost, thin-film solar cells. Such semiconductor grades of silicon are either slightly less pure or polycrystalline rather than monocrystalline, and are produced in comparable quantities as the monocrystalline silicon: 75,000 to 150,000 metric tons per year. The market for the lesser grade is growing more quickly than for monocrystalline silicon. By 2013, polycrystalline silicon production, used mostly in solar cells, was projected to reach 200,000 metric tons per year, while monocrystalline semiconductor grade silicon was expected to remain less than 50,000 tons per year.

Quantum dots
Silicon quantum dots are created through the thermal processing of hydrogen silsesquioxane into nanocrystals ranging from a few nanometers to a few microns, displaying size dependent luminescent properties. The nanocrystals display large Stokes shifts converting photons in the ultra-violet range to photons in the visible or infrared, depending on the particle size, allowing for applications in quantum dot displays and luminescent solar concentrators due to their limited self absorption. A benefit of using silicon based quantum dots over cadmium or indium is the non-toxic, metal-free nature of silicon.
Another application of silicon quantum dots is for sensing of hazardous materials. The sensors take advantage of the luminescent properties of the quantum dots through quenching of the photoluminescence in the presence of the hazardous substance. There are many methods used for hazardous chemical sensing with a few being electron transfer, fluorescence resonance energy transfer, and photocurrent generation. Electron transfer quenching occurs when the lowest unoccupied molecular orbital (LUMO) is slightly lower in energy than the conduction band of the quantum dot, allowing for the transfer electrons between the two, preventing recombination of the holes and electrons within the nanocrystals. The effect can also be achieved in reverse with a donor molecule having its highest occupied molecular orbital (HOMO) slightly higher than a valence band edge of the quantum dot, allowing electrons to transfer between them, filling the holes and preventing recombination. Fluorescence resonance energy transfer occurs when a complex forms between the quantum dot and a quencher molecule. The complex will continue to absorb light but when the energy is converted to the ground state it does not release a photon, quenching the material. The third method uses different approach by measuring the photocurrent emitted by the quantum dots instead of monitoring the photoluminescent display. If the concentration of the desired chemical increases then the photocurrent given off by the nanocrystals will change in response.

Biological role

Although silicon is readily available in the form of silicates, very few organisms use it directly. Diatoms, radiolaria, and siliceous sponges use biogenic silica as a structural material for their skeletons. Some plants accumulate silica in their tissues and require silicon for their growth, for example rice. Silicon may be taken up by plants as orthosilicic acid (also known as monosilicic acid) and transported through the xylem, where it forms amorphous complexes with components of the cell wall. This has been shown to improve cell wall strength and structural integrity in some plants, thereby reducing insect herbivory and pathogenic infections. In certain plants, silicon may also upregulate the production of volatile organic compounds and phytohormones which play a significant role in plant defense mechanisms. In more advanced plants, the silica phytoliths (opal phytoliths) are rigid microscopic bodies occurring in the cell. 

Several horticultural crops are known to protect themselves against fungal plant pathogens with silica, to such a degree that fungicide application may fail unless accompanied by sufficient silicon nutrition. Silicaceous plant defense molecules activate some phytoalexins, meaning some of them are signalling substances producing acquired immunity. When deprived, some plants will substitute with increased production of other defensive substances.

Life on Earth is largely composed of carbon, but astrobiology considers that extraterrestrial life may have other hypothetical types of biochemistry. Silicon is considered an alternative to carbon, as it can create complex and stable molecules with four covalent bonds, required for a DNA-analog, and it is available in large quantities.

Marine microbial influences 
Diatoms uses silicon in the biogenic silica form, which is taken up by the silicon transport protein (SIT) to be predominantly used in the cell wall structure as frustules.  Silicon enters the ocean in a dissolved form such as silicic acid or silicate.  Since diatoms are one of the main users of these forms of silicon, they contribute greatly to the concentration of silicon throughout the ocean. Silicon forms a nutrient-like profile in the ocean due to the diatom productivity in shallow depths. Therefore, less concentration of silicon in the upper ocean and more concentrations of silicon in the deep/lower ocean.

Diatom productivity in the upper ocean contribute to the amount of silicon exported to the lower ocean.  When diatom cells are lysed in the upper ocean, their nutrients such as iron, zinc, and silicon, are brought to the lower ocean through a process called marine snow. Marine snow involves the downward transfer of particulate organic matter by vertical mixing of dissolved organic matter.  It has been suggested that silicon is considered crucial to diatom productivity and as long as there is silicic acid available for diatoms to use, the diatoms can contribute to other important nutrient concentrations in the deep ocean as well.

In coastal zones, diatoms serve as the major phytoplanktonic organisms and greatly contribute to biogenic silica production. In the open ocean, however, diatoms have a reduced role in global annual silica production. Diatoms in North Atlantic and North Pacific subtropical gyres only contribute about 5-7% of global annual marine silica production. The Southern Ocean produces about one-third of global marine biogenic silica. The Southern Ocean is referred to as having a "biogeochemical divide" since only minuscule amounts of silicon are transported out of this region.

Human nutrition
There is some evidence that silicon is important to human health for their nail, hair, bone, and skin tissues, for example, in studies that demonstrate that premenopausal women with higher dietary silicon intake have higher bone density, and that silicon supplementation can increase bone volume and density in patients with osteoporosis. Silicon is needed for synthesis of elastin and collagen, of which the aorta contains the greatest quantity in the human body, and has been considered an essential element; nevertheless, it is difficult to prove its essentiality, because silicon is very common, and hence, deficiency symptoms are difficult to reproduce.

Silicon is currently under consideration for elevation to the status of a "plant beneficial substance by the Association of American Plant Food Control Officials (AAPFCO)."

Safety
People may be exposed to elemental silicon in the workplace by breathing it in, swallowing it, or having contact with the skin or eye. In the latter two cases, silicon poses a slight hazard as an irritant. It is hazardous if inhaled. The Occupational Safety and Health Administration (OSHA) has set the legal limit for silicon exposure in the workplace as 15 mg/m3 total exposure and 5 mg/m3 respiratory exposure over an eight-hour workday. The National Institute for Occupational Safety and Health (NIOSH) has set a recommended exposure limit (REL) of 10 mg/m3 total exposure and 5 mg/m3 respiratory exposure over an eight-hour workday. Inhalation of crystalline silica dust may lead to silicosis, an occupational lung disease marked by inflammation and scarring in the form of nodular lesions in the upper lobes of the lungs.

See also

 Amorphous silicon
 Black silicon
 Covalent superconductors
 List of countries by silicon production
 List of silicon producers
 Monocrystalline silicon
 Polycrystalline silicon
 Printed silicon electronics
 Silicene
 Silicon nanowire
 Silicon tombac
 Silicon Valley
 Transistor

References

Bibliography

External links
 
 
 
 

 
Chemical elements
Metalloids
Group IV semiconductors
Pyrotechnic fuels
Dietary minerals
Reducing agents
Native element minerals
Chemical elements with diamond cubic structure
Crystals in space group 227
Crystals in space group 206
Materials that expand upon freezing